João Paulo Feliciano Neves Benedito (born 7 October 1978) is a retired Portuguese futsal player. He played as a goalkeeper for Sporting CP, Playas de Castellón and the Portugal national team.

External links
Sporting CP profile
FPF national team profile
FPF club profile
UEFA profile

1978 births
Living people
Futsal goalkeepers
Portuguese men's futsal players
Sporting CP futsal players
Playas de Castellón FS players
Sportspeople from Lisbon